John "Jack" Hilton (2 May 1921 – 23 December 1998) was an English rugby league footballer who played in the 1940s and 1950s, and director. He later became a director at Wigan, and also had a spell as club chairman.

Biography
Born in Wigan, England on 2 May 1921, Hilton started his professional career at Salford. In October 1939, he scored six tries in a game against Leigh, a joint club record for number of tries scored in a single match. He later joined his hometown club Wigan, scoring 122 tries in 137 appearances. Hilton won caps for England while at Wigan in 1949 against France, in 1950 against Wales, and France, and won caps for Great Britain while at Wigan in 1950 against Australia (2 matches), and New Zealand (2 matches). Hilton played , i.e. number 5, and scored a try in Wigan's 8-3 victory over Bradford Northern in the 1947–48 Challenge Cup Final during the 1947–48 season at Wembley Stadium, London on Saturday 1 May 1948, in front of a crowd of 91,465. Hilton played , i.e. number 2, and scored a try in Wigan's 20–7 victory over Leigh in the 1949–50 Lancashire County Cup Final during the 1949–50 season at Wilderspool Stadium, Warrington on Saturday 29 October 1949.

References

External links
Statistics at wigan.rlfans.com

1921 births
1998 deaths
British rugby league administrators
England national rugby league team players
English rugby league players
Great Britain national rugby league team players
Rugby league players from Wigan
Rugby league wingers
Salford Red Devils players
Wigan Warriors players